Al-Asalah SC is a Jordanian professional football club based in Shafa Badran area North Amman, Jordan.

Current squad

Coaching staff

Kit providers
Adidas

External links

Asalah
Association football clubs established in 1995
1995 establishments in Jordan